The women's elimination race competition at the 2022 UEC European Track Championships was held on 13 August 2022.

Results

References

Women's elimination race
European Track Championships – Women's elimination race